Aybar Abdulla (born 22 January 2002) is a Kazakhstani footballer currently playing as a forward for Russian club Kairat Moscow.

Career statistics

Club

Notes

References

2002 births
Living people
Kazakhstani footballers
Association football forwards
Kazakhstan First Division players
Kazakhstan Premier League players
FC Kairat players
Kazakhstani expatriate footballers
Expatriate footballers in Russia
Russian Second League players